Lecithocera absumptella is a moth in the family Lecithoceridae. It was described by Francis Walker in 1864. It is found in Australia.

References

Moths described in 1864
absumptella